Southport Theatre is a theatre in Southport, England owned by Sefton Council.  The theatre presents a programme of touring shows, opera and children's shows throughout the year. The theatre is also a popular choice for national and international conferences & exhibitions and has recently undergone a £40m renovation as part of the overall redevelopment of the Southport area.

On 18 May 2020 the management of the venue went into liquidation.

References

Theatres in Merseyside
Culture in Merseyside
Buildings and structures in Southport
Tourist attractions in Merseyside
Performance art venues